Lumphini Park, also Lumpini or Lumpinee, is a 360 rai park in Bangkok, Thailand. The park offers rare open public space, trees, and playgrounds in the Thai capital and contains an artificial lake where visitors can rent boats. Paths around the park totalling approximately 2.5 km in length are a popular area for morning and evening joggers. Officially, cycling is only permitted during the day between the times of 10:00 to 15:00. There is a smoking ban throughout the park. Dogs are not allowed, except certified guide dogs only. Lumphini Park is regarded as the first public park in Bangkok and Thailand.

History

The 360 rai (about 57 hectares) plot of land, formerly known as Thung Sala Daeng ('Sala Daeng Feild', now Sala Daeng Intersection), was a private property of King Rama VI. In 1925, the king donated the land to the nation to be used as a fair ground. The Siamrat Phiphitthaphan Trade Fair was held here to promote Thai commodities and industrial productions among Thais and foreigners. After the fair, the king had a will to turn the land into a public park which was given the name Lumphini. It was named after Lumbini, the birthplace of the Buddha in Nepal for the prosperity, although its location at that time was considered the outskirts of the city. The construction was not finished yet, the king died first, but the construction continues until complete. In World War II the park was a Japanese Army camp. At the entrance in front of the park, the royal monument of the king was built for his memorial, inside the park, there are a clock tower of Chinese styled structure built in 1925, a public library which was the first one in the country, a public aquarium, children's play ground, sporting ground, and large swimming pool. It is a public park full of varieties of plants and suitable for recreational. 

Today it lies in the heart of the main business district and is in the Lumphini sub-district, on the north side of Rama IV Road, between Ratchadamri Road and Witthayu Road. 

In addition it is also connected to another public park, Benjakitti Park in Khlong Toei District, by means of the National Sports Development Fund-Sports Authority of Thailand (NSDF-SAT) Park, a 1.3 km elevated pedestrian walkway and bicycle lane at the corner of Sarasin Intersection where Witthayu Road cuts Sarasin Road.

Lumphini Park places
Lumphini Park is a multi-purpose park. Many activities are provided for citizens and tourists. The park is a green area. There are trees, flowers, lakes, and animals.

 King Rama VI statue - The statue of King Vajiravudh (Rama VI) was built in 1942 to commemorate the construction of the Lumphini Park.
Bird watching - Lumphini Park is a rich source of natural food and has large trees so it has become home to more than 30 species of birds. Bird watching instruction is available at Lumphini Park every year.
Smiling Sun Ground (also Larn Tawan Yim ) - Smiling Sun Ground is a place for activities for disabled people. It is full of resources and special parking lots for the disabled as well as playgrounds for children.
Bangkok Elder Citizens Club - Bangkok Elder Citizens Club is a place for elders to communicate, relax, exercise, and train. It is open from 08:00-18:00 daily. Dancing courses are available every Sunday-Saturday.
Home of Hope - A refuge for homeless children. They provide information, advice, and education to help homeless children. It is open 10:00-19:00 daily.
BMA Apprentice School - Offers training in various jobs including computer, cooking, tailor, and facial make-up.
Lumphini Park Library - Lumphini Park Library provides books and videos. Open from 08:00-20:00, Tuesday-Sunday.
Lumphini Youth Center - Offers sports activities and sports equipment for members. Sports activities including soccer, swimming, basketball, and dancing. On Monday to Friday it is open from 18:00-20:00. On weekends it is open 10:00-18:00.
Sri Thai Derm Food Center- Open 04:30-10:00 daily.
Lumphini Lake - Swan paddle boats can be rented at a lake for 40 baht per 30 minutes. In 1960s, in the middle of the lake was the former floating restaurant named Kinnari Nava, or Peninsula in Internationally. It was a distinctive  building where the bow on the top of the topless kinnari (half-woman, half-bird). It was closed due to a fire.
Buddhist Dharma Activities - Buddhist Dharma activities with Buddhist monks are held the last Sunday of every month from 07:00-09:00.
Music Festival - A Western music and Thai music festival in the park is held Sundays, January to April, from 17:30-20:00.

Venues and events
The park has Bangkok's first public library and dance hall. During winter, the Palm Garden of Lumphini Park becomes the site for the annual Concert in the Park featuring classical music by the Bangkok Symphony Orchestra and other bands.

Political rallies
Lumphini Park has been used as a rally ground for right-wing political gatherings. In 2006 the People's Alliance for Democracy (PAD) protested in the park against Prime Minister Thaksin Shinawatra. In 2013-2014 the park became one of the main protest sites of the People's Democratic Reform Committee (PDRC) against Prime Minister Yingluck Shinawatra.

Transportation
Lumphini Park is close to Sala Daeng Station on the BTS Skytrain's Silom Line, as well as Lumphini and Si Lom stations on the MRT Blue Line. The park is served by BMTA buses No. 4, 13, 14, 15, 17, 22, 45, 46, 47, 50, 62, 67, 74, 76, 77, 89, 109, 115, 116, 141, 149, 164, 173, 505, 507, 514, and 547.

References

Further reading
 Lumpini Park Information
 "Thailand", The National Geographic Traveler, 2001, p. 97

External links
Lumphini Park at the Thai Department of the Environment

Parks in Bangkok
Urban public parks
Pathum Wan district
1920s establishments in Siam
Unregistered ancient monuments in Bangkok